This page is a list of the hat-tricks scored for the Greece national football team. Since Greece's first international association football match in 1929, there have been 10 occasions when a Greek player has scored three or more goals (a hat-trick) in a game. The first hat-trick was scored by Antonis Tsolinas against Bulgaria on 7 December 1930, at the 1929-31 Balkan Cup. The record for the most goals scored in an international game by a Greek player is five, which has been achieved on just one occasion: by Dimitris Saravakos against Egypt in 1990, and he is closely followed by Antonis Tsolinas and Fanis Gekas who both managed to score 4 goals.

Fanis Gekas holds the record for the most hat-tricks scored by a Greek player with two, the first coming in a UEFA Euro 2008 qualifier against Malta and the second came in a 2010 World Cup qualifier in a 5–2 win over Latvia.

Hat-tricks scored by Greece

Hat-tricks conceded by Greece

See also
 Greece national football team results (1929–1959)
 Greece national football team results (1960–1979)
 Greece national football team results (1980–1999)
 Greece national football team results (2000–2019)
 Greece national football team results (2020–present)

References 

Greece
Greece